Słupy may refer to the following places:
Słupy, Nakło County in Kuyavian-Pomeranian Voivodeship (north-central Poland)
Słupy, Tuchola County in Kuyavian-Pomeranian Voivodeship (north-central Poland)
Słupy, Warmian-Masurian Voivodeship (north Poland)